John E. Robson (June 21, 1930 – March 20, 2002) was an American attorney who served as Chairman of the Civil Aeronautics Board from 1975 to 1977, United States Deputy Secretary of the Treasury from 1989 to 1992 and Chairman and President of the Export–Import Bank of the United States from 2001 to 2002. Robson also served as Under Secretary of Transportation in the Lyndon B. Johnson administration.

Robson was born in Washington, D.C. and grew up in Chicago. He died of cancer on March 20, 2002, in Washington, D.C. at age 71.

References

External links

1930 births
2002 deaths
United States Deputy Secretaries of the Treasury
Yale University alumni
Harvard Law School alumni
People from Chicago
Ford administration personnel
Lyndon B. Johnson administration personnel
George H. W. Bush administration personnel
George W. Bush administration personnel
Export–Import Bank of the United States people
Deaths from cancer in Washington, D.C.
American investment bankers
Emory University faculty
Washington, D.C., Republicans